The Vicariate for Palestinian–Jordanian Communities in the USA are Eastern Orthodox Church parishes in the United States of America directly under the jurisdiction of the Ecumenical Patriarchate of Constantinople.

History
The Patriarchate of Jerusalem has a long history in the United States dating back to the 1920s. In 2002, Archbishop Damaskinos of Jaffa was appointed as Epitropos (Vicar). These parishes remained under the Jerusalem Patriarchate until 2007, when the Jerusalem Patriarchate subsequently decided to leave the jurisdictional scene in North America.  

On August 5, 2008, the Greek Orthodox Archdiocese of America, which is an eparchy of the Ecumenical Patriarchate of Constantinople, announced that the Patriarchate of Constantinople had agreed with the Patriarchate of Jerusalem to transfer the Jerusalem parishes in America to a "Vicariate for Palestinian/Jordanian Communities in the USA" within the Ecumenical Patriarchate of Constantinople.  The vicar would operate under the authority of the primate of the Greek Orthodox Archdiocese of America.

As of 2008, there were 15 parishes involved: nine in California; one in the State of Washington; one in Arizona; one in New York; one in Pennsylvania; one in Massachusetts; and one in Georgia.

See also

Greek Orthodox Archdiocese of North America
Romfea.gr

References

External links
Albishara Orthodox Church, San Bernardino, CA

Dioceses of the Greek Orthodox Archdiocese of America
Greek Orthodox Church of Jerusalem
Jordanian-American culture
Palestinian-American culture